

Meningie West is a locality in the Australian state of South Australia located in the state’s south-east about  south-east of the state capital of Adelaide and about  south-west of the municipal seat in Tailem Bend.

Its boundaries were created on 24 August 2000.

Meningie West is located on an isthmus of land between the localities of Narrung in the west and Meningie in the east and bounded by the waters of Lake Albert to the north-east and by The Coorong to the south-west.  A road passes through the locality from the settlement of Raukkan in Narrung on the shore of Lake Alexandrina to the town centre in Meningie.

The majority land use within Meningie West is for agricultural purposes, however the land within the locality’s centre and adjoining Lake Albert is zoned as ‘River Murray Fringe’ and ‘River Murray Flood Zone’ in order to protect both the natural environment and aspects of Aboriginal and European cultural heritage.  Land on the coast with The Coorong is part of the Coorong National Park and is zoned for ‘conservation’.

The 2016 Australian census which was conducted in August 2016 reports that Meningie West shared a population of 34 people with an adjoining part of Narrung.

Meningie West is located within the federal division of Barker, the state electoral district of MacKillop and the local government area of the Coorong District Council.

References
Notes

Citations

 

Towns in South Australia